Johora is a genus of freshwater crabs found in the Malay Peninsula and surrounding islands. It includes the following species:

Johora aipooae (Ng, 1986)
Johora counsilmani (Ng, 1985)
Johora gapensis (Bott, 1966)
Johora grallator Ng, 1988
Johora gua Yeo, 2001
Johora hoiseni Ng & Takeda, 1992
Johora intermedia (Ng, 1986)
Johora johorensis (Roux, 1936)
Johora murphyi (Ng, 1986)
Johora punicea (Ng, 1985)
Johora singaporensis (Ng, 1986)
Johora tahanensis (Bott, 1966)
Johora thaiana Leelawathanagoon, Lheknim & Ng, 2005
Johora thoi Ng, 1990
Johora tiomanensis (Ng & L. W. H. Tan, 1984)

Four of the species are listed as vulnerable species by the International Union for Conservation of Nature, one is Near Threatened, one is Data Deficient, and one, Johora singaporensis, is Critically Endangered.

References

Potamoidea